The Danson name is first found in Lancashire, North West England. Conjecturally descended from an Anglo-Norman noble, Ive or Ive Taillebois, who held large portions of Northern Lancashire and that part of West Morland that came under the Barony of Kendall.
Other spellings include: Danison, Danisone, Dansone and others.

People
Alex Danson, female English field hockey player, who has represented both Great Britain and England
Barney Danson (1921–2011), Canadian politician
Ernest Denny Logie Danson, known for his time in the 20th century as the Bishop of Edinburgh
Sir Francis Chatillon Danson, nobleman from Liverpool who was known for calculating potential liabilities for insurance of large ships
Herbie Danson (1883–1963), English footballer
Jane Danson (born 1978), English actress
Mike Danson, English entrepreneur who founded Datamonitor and GlobalData and proprietor of New Statesman magazine
Paul Danson, retired English football referee from Leicester
Ted Danson, American actor, known for the award-winning TV comedy Cheers
Yvonne Danson, English long-distance track runner, who holds various time trial records
Danson Tang, Taiwanese model

See also

Danton (name)

English-language surnames